Palagolla is a village in Sri Lanka. It is located within Uva Province.

External links

Populated places in Uva Province